is a Japanese football club based in Kurobe, Toyama Prefecture. They play in Toyama Prefectural League. Their team colour is blue.

History
The club was founded as the football club of YKK (then Yoshida Kōgyō) in 1962. They won the inaugural 1972 season title of the Hokushin'etsu Regional League, and went on to win another 10 championships in the league before they were promoted to the JFL for the 2001 season. They changed their name to the current one in 2004 when YKK passed the ownership to one of their affiliate company, YKK AP (AP stands for Architectural Products).

As they were in regional league, ALO's Hokuriku had been the biggest rival all the time as they have to compete for right to participate in Emperor's Cup as the representative of Toyama.

Merger as a professional team
On September 10, 2007, YKK and Hokuriku Electric Power Company, the owner of ALO's Hokuriku, agreed with merging their teams to aim promotion to the J. League, the professional football league in Japan, in response of eager request by Toyama football association (TFA). According to Tulip TV, local broadcasting company, over 20 companies informally promised to invest in the new team. In the media briefing, Governor of Toyama Prefecture also participated.

TFA has founded an organization named "Civic Soccer Club Team of Toyama Prefecture (富山県民サッカークラブチーム)" with two major economic organization and representatives of Hokuriku Electric Power Company and YKK. The Japan Football League confirmed that the merged club would compete in the JFL from the 2008 season. The new merged club is named Kataller Toyama.

After the merger, YKK AP decided to reform the club as an amateur club whose players are mostly YKK AP's employees. They play in Toyama Prefectural League from 2008.

Results in JFL
2001: 6th 
2002: 8th 
2003: 6th 
2004: 4th 
2005: runners-up 
2006: 4th
2007: 6th

Kataller Toyama
Football clubs in Japan
Association football clubs established in 1962
Sports teams in Toyama Prefecture
1962 establishments in Japan
Japan Football League clubs
Works association football clubs in Japan